SEFL may refer to:

 Southeast Football League, American football league
 Tracy Sefl, American political consultant